Duncan Menzies (born 25 February 1994 in Arbroath, Angus, Scotland) is a Scottish curler. He currently plays third on Team Cameron Bryce.

Teams

Men's

Mixed

Mixed doubles

References

External links

Curling World Cup profile

 
 
 

Living people
1994 births
People from Arbroath
Scottish male curlers
Scottish curling champions
Curlers at the 2012 Winter Youth Olympics